7346 Boulanger, provisional designation , is a Koronian asteroid from the outer regions of the asteroid belt, approximately  in diameter. It was discovered on 20 February 1993, by Belgian astronomer Eric Elst at the CERGA Observatory in Caussols, southeastern France. It was named after French Enlightenment philosopher Nicolas Boulanger.

Orbit and classification 

Boulanger is a member of the Koronis family, a very large outer asteroid family with nearly co-planar ecliptical orbits. It orbits the Sun in the outer main-belt at a distance of 2.6–3.1 AU once every 4 years and 11 months (1,781 days; semi-major axis of 2.88 AU). Its orbit has an eccentricity of 0.08 and an inclination of 3° with respect to the ecliptic.

The body's observation arc begins with a precovery taken at Palomar Observatory in April 1955, nearly 38 years prior to its official discovery observation at Caussols.

Physical characteristics 

In the SDSS-based taxonomy, Boulanger is a common, stony S-type asteroid, which agrees with the overall spectral type for Koronian asteroids. It has an absolute magnitude of 12.8. As of 2018, no rotational lightcurve of Boulanger has been obtained from photometric observations. The body's rotation period, pole and shape remain unknown.

Diameter and albedo 

According to the survey carried out by the NEOWISE mission of NASA's Wide-field Infrared Survey Explorer, Boulanger measures 7.378 kilometers in diameter and its surface has an albedo of 0.270.

Naming 

This minor planet was named after Enlightenment philosopher and geologist Nicolas Antoine Boulanger (1722–1759). The official naming citation was published by the Minor Planet Center on 24 June 2002.

References

External links 
 Dictionary of Minor Planet Names, Google books
 Discovery Circumstances: Numbered Minor Planets (5001)-(10000) – Minor Planet Center
 
 

007346
Discoveries by Eric Walter Elst
Named minor planets
19930220